WPLM-FM (99.1 FM, "Easy 99.1") is a soft adult contemporary music station licensed to Plymouth, Massachusetts. It is owned by Plymouth Rock Broadcasting Co. and has a sister AM station by the same callsign. Its transmitter is located in Plymouth. With a 50,000 watt signal, WPLM-FM can be received in Boston, Cape Cod, the South Coast region, and Providence, Rhode Island, in addition to the South Shore.

History
WPLM-FM signed on June 25, 1961.  In the station's first decades on the air, it had a big band format.  This was abandoned in February 1994 in favor of an adult contemporary format, branded "Variety 99.1".  However, the station saw little success with this format, due to there being several other stations with a similar format within WPLM's coverage area, and as a result it switched to smooth jazz on June 25, 1995.  Initially, programming was largely provided by SW Networks' Smooth FM service, with WPLM-FM itself branding as "Smooth FM 99.1"; however, after Smooth FM closed on December 31, 1996, the station switched to a similar service from Jones Radio Networks and reimaged as "Jazzy 99.1".  Two years later, the smooth jazz format was discontinued in favor of "Easy 99.1", which initially featured a blend of adult standards and soft adult contemporary.

From WPLM-FM's inception, its programming has been simulcast, in whole or in part, with its sister AM station, which signed on six years earlier; from 1997 to 2015, the AM station broke away on weekdays to carry business news and talk programming from WADN/WBNW (1120).

In April 2020, the station temporarily suspended its live streaming due to financial problems stemming from the pandemic. The stream was restored later in the year.

WPLM has also taken over WXKS-FM's decades-old tradition of playing Rose Royce's 1977 single "Wishing On A Star" every Saturday at 12 noon.

Notable past and present personnel include Tom Stewart, Audrey Constant, Scott Reiniche, Billy Teed, Chris Rogers, Ken Coleman, Ron Della Chiesa, Bill O'Connell, Sean Casey and Barry Scott of The Lost 45s.

References

External links

PLM-FM
Soft adult contemporary radio stations in the United States
Radio stations established in 1961
Plymouth, Massachusetts
Mass media in Plymouth County, Massachusetts
1961 establishments in Massachusetts